NEXTAR (from NEC Next　Generation　Star) is a Low Earth orbit Earth observation satellite bus designed and manufactured by NEC Space Systems of Japan.

Its telemetry and control subsystem includes S band and X band channels.

Platform models
As of 2014, there are three different models of the NEXTAR standardized platform. All feature a common core of features like using the SpaceWire communications protocol, the SpaceCube2 on-board computer and autonomous control functions. The different models are:

 NX-300L: Low Earth orbit platform for small observation satellites in the  range. It was born out of the ASNARO 1 work and is used mainly for Earth observation applications.
 NX-1500L: Low Earth orbit platform for medium observation satellites in the  range. It began with the work on GCOM-W and is used mainly for Earth observation applications.
 NX-G: Geosynchronous orbit platform for small communication satellites in the  range. Based on the work of the WINDS satellite, it will be used mainly for communications applications.

List of satellites
Satellites using the NEXTAR platform.

See also
 Star Bus – Another comparable satellite bus made by Orbital ATK.

References

External links
 NEC's NEXTAR page

Satellites of Japan
Satellite buses